Paproski is a surname. Notable people with the surname include:

 Carl Paproski (1945–2008), Canadian politician
 Kenneth Paproski (1931–2007), Canadian politician
 Steve Paproski (1928–1993), Canadian politician and football player

See also
 Paprocki